William Stèvie Kossangue-Toro (born March 9, 1986) is a Central African professional basketball player who currently plays for Union Sportive Alfortville Basket of the Nationale Masculine 3 (NM3).

Early life 
Kossangue was born on March 9, 1986, in Bangui, Central African Republic. His father, Jean, was an attorney.

Collegiate career 
Kossangue played college basketball at Tyler Junior College before transferring to play with the Campbell Fighting Camels.

International career 
Kossangue has previously represented Central African Republic in international competition. He played for his country at the 2009, 2011, and 2013 AfroBaskets. Kossangue was named to the 20-man preliminary squad for Central African Republic at the AfroBasket 2015 by head coach Aubin-Thierry Goporo. However, he was ruled out of the squad for the official event.

References 

Living people
1986 births
Shooting guards
Small forwards
People from Bangui
Campbell Fighting Camels basketball players
Tyler Junior College alumni
Central African Republic men's basketball players
Central African Republic expatriate basketball people in the United States
Central African Republic expatriate basketball people in France